Safarilink Aviation Limited (operating as Safarilink)  is a regional airline based at Wilson Airport in Nairobi, Kenya.

Fleet

Current fleet
The Safarilink Aviation fleet consists of the following aircraft (as of September 2020):

Historical fleet
The airline's fleet previously also included the following aircraft type:
De Havilland Twin Otter

Destinations
As of August 2019, the airline serviced the following destinations, among others.

Associations and memberships
In September 2019, Safarilink Aviation became a member of the African Airlines Association (AFRAA).

References

External links
Official website

Airlines of Kenya
Airlines established in 2004
Kenyan companies established in 2004